William White (1807 – 11 February 1882), was a prominent 19th-century British pamphleteer and parliamentary sketch writer.

Biography
The character of Zachariah Coleman in Hale White’s The Revolution in Tanner’s Lane, published in 1887, "is a tribute to William White... [Zachariah Coleman's] love of Byron, and his admiration for Cobbett, came from William White."

William White died in Carshalton, Surrey, on 11 February 1882.

References

1807 births
1882 deaths
People educated at Bedford School
British male journalists
British political journalists
19th-century British journalists
Male journalists
19th-century British male writers